Jonathan Dowling (born December 8, 1991) is a former American football safety. He most recently played for the Toronto Argonauts. He was drafted by the Oakland Raiders in the seventh round of the 2014 NFL Draft. He played college football at Western Kentucky.

Early years
Dowling attended Southeast High School. He participated in the 2010 Under Armour All-American Game along with being selected to the Top 150 Dream Team by PrepStar Magazine. He had 58 tackles, 14 interceptions in his senior season in high school. He was selected named 4A FSWA All-State team. He was ranked as s four-star prospect by both Scout.com and Rivals.com. He also was ranked as the 5th best safety prospect in the country by Scout.com.

College career
He spent his freshman season at Florida where he played special teams until he transferred to Western Kentucky. After his Junior season, On December 15, 2013, it was announced he will forgo his senior season to enter the 2014 NFL Draft. During his time at Western Kentucky, He finished with a total 135 tackles, 9 Iinterceptions. 20 pass deflections and 8 forced fumbles.

Professional career

Oakland Raiders
Dowling was selected by the Oakland Raiders in the 7th round (247th overall) of the 2014 NFL Draft. The pick used to draft him was acquired from the Seattle Seahawks in a trade for Terrelle Pryor. On August 29, 2015, he was released by the Raiders for reasons that had to do with "maturity" rather than his field play.

Miami Dolphins
On September 9, 2015, Dowling was signed to the Miami Dolphins' practice squad. On October 15, 2015, the Miami Dolphins signed him to the active roster.

Buffalo Bills 
On December 23, 2015, the Buffalo Bills signed Dowling to their practice squad.

Dowling tore his ACL in the Bills' third preseason game and was placed on injured reserve.

On June 1, 2017, Dowling was released by the Bills.

Toronto Argonauts
Dowling signed with the Toronto Argonauts of the Canadian Football League on April 6, 2018. He spent time on the active roster and practice roster during the 2018 and 2019 seasons. He was released on February 3, 2020.

References

External links
Oakland Raiders bio
Western Kentucky Hilltoppers bio

1991 births
Living people
American football safeties
American players of Canadian football
Buffalo Bills players
Canadian football defensive backs
Florida Gators football players
Oakland Raiders players
Miami Dolphins players
Players of American football from Florida
Sportspeople from Bradenton, Florida
Toronto Argonauts players
Western Kentucky Hilltoppers football players